Allotiso is a monotypic genus of  dwarf spiders containing the single species, Allotiso lancearius. It was first described by A. V. Tanasevitch in 1990, and has only been found in Georgia and in Turkey.

See also
 List of Linyphiidae species

References

Linyphiidae
Monotypic Araneomorphae genera
Spiders of Asia